Proud Lake State Recreation Area is a state-managed public park and recreation area located in Commerce Township, Oakland County, Michigan, near Wixom. It is under the jurisdiction of the Michigan Department of Natural Resources. A campground has 130 campsites and a 24-person cabin for rent.

External links
Proud Lake Recreation Area Michigan Department of Natural Resources
Recreation Passport Michigan DNR
Proud Lake Nature Study Area Protected Planet (World Database on Protected Areas)

State recreation areas of Michigan
Protected areas of Oakland County, Michigan
Huron River (Michigan)